Sherman Eugene White (born October 6, 1948) is a former American football defensive lineman who played in the National Football League between 1972 and 1983.  He was selected by the Cincinnati Bengals in the first round with the second overall pick in the 1972 NFL Draft out of the University of California, Berkeley. 

White played four seasons with the Cincinnati Bengals, before White moved to the Buffalo Bills to replace the person whom the Bills had selected first overall in the same draft: Walt Patulski, who was mired in a squabble with Bills head coach Lou Saban. White went on to play eight seasons with the Bills before retiring.

Sherman has four children.

Sherman White is in the University of California, Berkeley Hall of Fame.

References

1948 births
Living people
All-American college football players
American football defensive ends
Buffalo Bills players
California Golden Bears football players
Cincinnati Bengals players
Sportspeople from Manchester, New Hampshire

 
Sherman white has 4 great children Spencer white,Diana White,Noelle White and Naomi White